The League Against Cruel Sports, formerly known as the League for the Prohibition of Cruel Sports, is a UK-based animal welfare charity which campaigns to stop blood sports such as fox hunting, hare and deer hunting; game bird shooting; and animal fighting. The charity helped bring about the Hunting Act 2004 and Protection of Wild Mammals (Scotland) Act 2002, which banned hunting with hounds in England, Wales and Scotland.

History

The League for the Prohibition of Cruel Sports was founded in 1924 by Ernest Bell, Henry B. Amos and George Greenwood, with the support of Henry S. Salt, Edward Carpenter and George Bernard Shaw. It was renamed to the League Against Cruel Sports in 1938.

Timeline

 1924 – The League was founded by Henry B. Amos to oppose rabbit coursing – he was successful in achieving a ban. This resulted in the organisation expanding its remit to include other blood sports – such as fox, hare and deer hunting.
 1975 – A bill seeking to ban hare coursing, supported by the League, was passed through the House of Commons, but did not receive approval in the House of Lords.
 1978 – The League secured legal protection for otters, including a ban on hunting them. The aquatic mammal was up until that point hunted with packs of hounds, one of the reasons for their numbers declining.
 1992 – The League helped secure the Protection of Badgers Act, which expanded the protection of the mammals themselves to their setts. The homes of badgers are illegally targeted for several reasons, including being blocked by fox hunts to stop animals being pursued by hounds fleeing underground.
 2002 – Fox, hare and deer hunting and hare coursing was banned in Scotland under the Protection of Wild Mammals (Scotland) Act 2002, which was introduced by MSPs following campaigning by the League and other animal protection organisations.
 2004 – Fox, hare and deer hunting and hare coursing was banned in England and Wales under the Hunting Act 2004. The legislation was introduced by MPs following campaigning by the League and other animal protection organisations.
 2005 – The Hunting Act 2004 came into force – making fox, hare and deer hunting and coursing illegal across England and Wales.
 2005 – The Waterloo Cup hare coursing competition held its final meeting at Great Altcar in Lancashire, closing after 169 years following passage of the Hunting Act.
 2006 – A huntsman with the Exmoor Foxhounds was found guilty of illegally hunting foxes with dogs in a private prosecution brought by LACS, but the case was overturned on appeal.
 2007 – Two members of the Quantock Staghounds were successfully prosecuted by the League following chasing a deer across Exmoor.
 2008 – Two members of the Minehead Harriers pleaded guilty to chasing a fox with a pack of hounds in a private prosecution by LACS.
 2009 – The League announced a new campaign against dog fighting, amidst news reports that there is an increase in dog fighting in London.
 2014  - The League celebrates 90 years of campaigning against cruelty to animals in the name of sport. Figures from the Ministry of Justice show that there have been 341 convictions under the Hunting Act 2004.
 2015 – Prime Minister David Cameron offered a free-vote on repealing the Hunting Act, backing down shortly afterwards following pressure form the League, MPs and other animal protection organisations. 
 2015 – Cross-channel ferry companies stop shipping pheasants and partridges from French factory-farms to British shooting estates, following an investigation and lobbying by the League.
 2018 – Conservative Party drops its manifesto commitment to offer a free-vote on repealing the Hunting Act following pressure from the League, meaning no Westminster party any longer supports repealing the hunting ban. 
 2018 – Scottish Government announces intention to strengthen the Protection of Wild Mammals (Scotland) Act 2002, which bans hunting with hounds in Scotland, following pressure from the League and other animal protection organisations. 
 2018 – Welsh Government bans pheasant and partridge shooting on public land following campaigning and pressure from the League and Animal Aid.
 2018 – The Labour Party backs calls made by the League to strengthen the Hunting Act – including prison sentences for those who chase and kill wild mammals.
 2019 – University of Wales suspends pheasant shooting on its countryside campus at Gregynog Hall following campaigning by the League.

See also
List of animal rights groups
List of animal welfare groups
Anti-hunting

References

External links

1924 establishments in the United Kingdom
Animal charities based in the United Kingdom
Animal welfare organisations based in the United Kingdom
Anti-hunting organizations
Godalming
Hunting and shooting in the United Kingdom
Organisations based in Surrey
Organizations established in 1924
Political advocacy groups in the United Kingdom
Politics and sports
Wildlife sanctuaries of the United Kingdom